Ali Asghar Mounesan is an Iranian politician and former minister of Ministry of Cultural Heritage, Handicrafts and Tourism, was appointed on 13 August 2017 by President Hassan Rouhani.

He was formerly head of the Free Trade Zone in Kish Island, general manager of the Mostazafan Foundation company Atisaz and the general manager of the Engineering and Development Organization of the City of Tehran. In 2014, he was appointed as a board member of Persepolis F.C.

During the COVID-19 pandemic in Iran, he contracted novel coronavirus. He had recovered from the virus.

References 

1970 births
Living people
Heads of Cultural Heritage, Handicrafts and Tourism Organization